1922 Polish Football Championship was the 3rd edition of the Polish Football Championship (Non-League) and 2nd completed season ended with the selection of a winner. The championship was decided in final tournament played among eight teams (winners of the regional A-Class championship) participated in the league which was divided into 2 groups: a Northern and a Southern one. The winners of both groups, Warta Poznań and Pogoń Lwów, played a 2 leg final match for the title. The champions were Pogoń Lwów, who won their 1st Polish title.

Competition modus
The final tournaments started on 29 July 1922 and concluded on 22 October 1922 (spring-autumn system). In each of groups the season was played as a round-robin tournament. A total of 8 teams participated. Each team played a total of 6 matches, half at home and half away, two games against each other team. Teams received two points for a win and one point for a draw. The winners of both groups played a 2 leg final match for the title.

Final tournament tables

Northern Group

Southern Group

Final matches

Top goalscorers

References

Bibliography

External links
 Poland – List of final tables at RSSSF 
 List of Polish football championships 
 List of Polish football championships 

Polish Football Championship, 1922
Polish Football Championship, 1922
Polish
Polish
Seasons in Polish football competitions